KLVH (90.9 FM) is a radio station broadcasting Educational Media Foundation's Contemporary Christian K-Love format. Licensed to Prescott, Arizona, United States, it serves the Phoenix, Prescott and Flagstaff areas. Previously owned by Grand Canyon Broadcasters, Inc. and operated under the name Radioshine, in 2012 the station was given to Arizona Christian University. In 2013, the station was named the "Small Market Station of the Year" by Christian Music Broadcasters and later that year was rebranded as Arizona Shine.

Effective October 16, 2015, KGCB and translators K214DT and K270BA were sold to Educational Media Foundation for $1 million.

On November 15, 2016, KGCB changed their call letters to KPLV. On December 1, 2016, KPLV changed their call letters to KLVH.

Translators

References

External links

Contemporary Christian radio stations in the United States
Radio stations established in 1995
1995 establishments in Arizona
K-Love radio stations
Educational Media Foundation radio stations
LVH